The 2017 AFL season was the 121st season in the Australian Football League contested by the Sydney Swans. The team's reserve side also participated in the 2017 NEAFL season.

Squad for 2017
Statistics are correct as of end of 2016 season.
Flags represent the state of origin, i.e. the state in which the player played his under 18 football.

For players: (c) denotes captain, (vc) denotes vice-captain, (lg) denotes leadership group.
For coaches: (s) denotes senior coach, (cs) denotes caretaker senior coach, (a) denotes assistant coach, (d) denotes development coach.

Playing list changes

The following summarises all player changes between the conclusion of the 2015 season and the beginning of the 2016 season.

In

Out

List management

Season summary

Pre-season matches

Home and away season

Finals matches

Ladder

Awards and records

VFL/AFL records

The Swans became the first team ever to make the finals after starting 0-6.

Bob Skilton Medal
The Bob Skilton Medal is an annual award presented to the club's best and fairest player throughout the season. It was given to Luke Parker for the 2017 season.

Rising Star Award: Lewis Melican

Dennis Carroll Trophy for Most Improved Player: George Hewett

Barry Round Shield for Best Clubman: Callum Sinclair

Paul Kelly Players’ Player: Josh Kennedy

Paul Roos Award for Best Player in a Finals Series: Heath Grundy & Kieren Jack

All-Australian Team
The 2017 All-Australian team included two Swans players in the initial 40-man squad, before naming just Lance Franklin in the final team.

Milestones

Debuts

1Had previously played for another club but played their first match for the Sydney Swans.

AFL Rising Star
Each round during the season a different eligible player is nominated for the annual award of AFL Rising Star, with a panel of experts voting on the nominated players at the end of the year. In 2017 two Swans players received nominations for the award.

22 Under 22 Team
The 22 Under 22 team is a selection of the best team of AFL players under the age of 22, as selected by fans in an online poll. Three Swans players were selected for the team in 2017.

Reserves

Regular season

Finals series

References

Sydney Swans seasons
Sydney